Jacqueline Thiédot (1925–2017) was a French film editor. She worked for several decades in the French film industry. She was nominated for a César Award for Best Editing for her work on Nelly and Mr. Arnaud at the 1996 Awards.

Selected filmography
 The Call of Destiny (1953)
 April Fools' Day (1954)
 Gas-Oil (1955)
 Short Head (1956)
 Fugitive in Saigon (1957)
 Retour de manivelle (1957)
 The Possessors (1958)
 Archimède le clochard (1959)
 The Counterfeiters of Paris (1961)
 Taxi for Tobruk (1961)
 Emile's Boat (1962)
 I Killed Rasputin (1967)
 The Things of Life (1970)
 Max et les ferrailleurs (1971)
 Le Far West (1973)
 A Simple Story (1978)
 Little Girl in Blue Velvet (1978)
 Fire's Share (1978)
 Les Égouts du paradis (1979)
 Mon Curé Chez les Nudistes (1982)
 Waiter! (1983)
 The Ruffian (1983)
 A Few Days with Me (1988)
 A Heart in Winter (1992)
 Nelly and Mr. Arnaud (1995)

References

Bibliography
 Hallet, Marion. Romy Schneider: A Star Across Europe. Bloomsbury Publishing, 2022.

External links

1925 births
2017 deaths
French film editors
People from Lyon